The 1993 Lincolnshire County Council election was held on Thursday, 6 May 1993. The whole council of 76 members was up for election and the election resulted in no party winning an overall majority of seats on the council. The Conservative Party lost control of the council for the first time since 1973, winning 31 seats. The Labour Party and the Liberal Democrats both made gains at the expense of the Conservatives, winning 25 and 15 seats respectively.

Results by division
Each electoral division returned one county councillor. The results in each division are shown in the table below.

References

1993
1993 English local elections
1990s in Lincolnshire